The Kinmen Fisheries Research Institute (KFRI) is a fish research center in Jincheng Township, Kinmen, Taiwan with the aim of protecting biodiversity, balance, sustainable resource management and development of life, production and ecology.

History
The research institute was founded in 1968 by Kinmen County Government.

Organizational structures
 Marine fishery
 Aquaculture
 Administration
 Accounting

Research
The research institute conducts researches on breeding and testing of fish and shellfish, fish disease control, marine resources, ecological surveys, fishery scientific research, development of aquatic food products and fishery consultations.

Architecture
The institute features the horseshoe crab ecological cultural center.

See also
 Agriculture in Taiwan

References

External links
 

1968 establishments in Taiwan
Agricultural research institutes in Taiwan
Fisheries and aquaculture research institutes
Jincheng Township
Organizations based in Kinmen County
Research institutes established in 1968